Shlomo Ben-Yosef (May 7, 1913 - June 29, 1938) was a member of the Revisionist Zionist underground group Irgun. He is most noted for his participation in an April 21, 1938 attack on a bus carrying Arab civilians, intended as a retaliation for an earlier attack by Arabs against Jews, and emblematic as a rejection of the establishment policy of Havlagah, or restraint. For this reason, and especially for having been the first Jew executed by the British authorities during the mandate period, Ben-Yosef became a martyr for the Revisionist cause and is commemorated by the State of Israel as one of 12 Olei Hagardom.

Early life
Shlomo Ben-Yosef was born Szalom Tabacznik in Lutsk, in the Volhynian Governorate of the Russian Empire (now in Ukraine) to a religious Polish-speaking Jewish family. He joined the Revisionist Zionist youth movement Betar in 1928, and two years later, he became the family breadwinner after the death of his father.

In 1937, he decided to emigrate to Mandatory Palestine. After his application for an immigration certificate was rejected, he illegally immigrated to Palestine, arriving on September 20, 1937. There, he joined the Betar labor company at Rosh Pinna - upon arrival there, he burned his Polish passport and changed his name to Shlomo Ben-Yosef. Shortly after arriving at Rosh Pinna, he was accepted into the Irgun. He found a job at the port of Haifa.

April 21, 1938 revenge attack 
On March 28, 1938, a car containing 10 Jews was ambushed by Arabs on the Acre-Safad road and six of them were killed. In revenge, Shlomo Ben-Yosef (24), Avraham Shein (17) and Yehoshua "Shalom" Zurabin (19), all of whom were Betar members from Rosh Pina, began planning a revenge attack.

On April 21, 1938, armed with a hand grenade and two guns, Ben-Yosef, Shein, and Zurabin ambushed an Arab bus staged on the Tiberias–Rosh Pina road, a mountain road near Safed. Their plan was to destroy the engine with a hand-grenade; as the bus approached, they shot at it and Ben-Yosef tossed the grenade, which failed to detonate it. The bus drove away.

The incident occurred at the crest of the 1936–1938 Arab Revolt, and during a high point in tensions between British authorities and the Revisionist Zionist movement. The three perpetrators were soon discovered hiding in a nearby cowshed in the possession of pistols and home-made bombs.

Trial and execution
Ben-Yosef, Shein, and Zurabin were put on trial in the Haifa Military Court, charged with offenses under the Emergency (Defence) Regulations. They pleaded not guilty. Shein and Ben-Yosef were found guilty of discharging a firearm and carrying firearms, bombs and ammunition, but not guilty of a third charge of throwing bombs with intention to cause death or injury. Zurabin was found not guilty of all charges on grounds of insanity, and "ordered to be kept in custody as a criminal lunatic until further notice". Shein and Ben-Yosef were sentenced to death by hanging. According to Shlaim, as the verdict was announced, Shein and Zurabin stood up and shouted at the top of their voices: "Long live the Kingdom of Israel on both banks of the Jordan!" Shein's death sentence was commuted to life imprisonment when his birth certificate fetched from Poland proved he was under 18 years old. He was released in 1946. General Robert Haining, the commander of British forces in Palestine, confirmed Ben-Yosef's death sentence, and an attempt by Ben-Yosef's counsel to secure a stay of execution was unsuccessful.

According to J. Bowyer Bell, there was hope that due to the fact that the attack had not killed anyone, and that because Ben-Yosef was of good character and without any previous record, his death sentence would be commuted, as a similar case involving an Arab youth from Gaza who was found to be of good character had ended with a reprieve, but the British authorities, who had used the death penalty for convicted Arabs over the course of the Arab Revolt, wanted to hang Ben-Yosef as a demonstration of their even-handedness, and General Haining was pressured to confirm Ben-Yosef's death sentence by senior figures in the Palestine Mandate administration.

The British authorities received many appeals for clemency from the Yishuv, from both Jewish organizations and individuals, as well as from the Jewish diaspora, which took great interest in the case. According to Bell, "it was so patent that the sentence related not to Ben-Yosef's crime but to the furtherance of British policy that outrage spread far beyond the Yishuv." Robert Briscoe, an Irish-Jewish politician, unsuccessfully sought a legal loophole to stay the execution. Due to his Polish citizenship, the Polish government also lodged a request for clemency in the name of Shalom Tabachnik. All requests for clemency were refused. David Ben-Gurion, then chairman of the Zionist Executive, even though he strongly opposed the Irgun and especially Ben-Yosef's attack, met with the British High Commissioner and begged him to pardon Ben Yosef. Ben-Yosef objected to the amnesty requests and rejected an Irgun plan to release him from prison . "Lehi" says Lexicon that he did so "in order to determine the image of a fearless Hebrew warrior who sacrifices his life for the sake of his people and his homeland." Before his death, Ben Yosef wrote: "I am going to die, and I am not at all sorry, because I am going to die for our country!" The night before his execution, a group of journalists visited Ben-Yosef in his cell in Acre Prison, where he refused consolation, declared that he was proud to be the first Jew to go to the gallows, and said "in dying I shall do my people a greater service than in life. Let the world see that Jews are not afraid to face death." On the wall of his death cell, he etched out "to die or to conquer the height" and "death compared with one's country is nothing."

Ben-Yosef was executed in Acre Prison on June 29, 1938. Due to his execution date falling on Rosh Chodesh, no rabbi was available to give him consolation. While being escorted to the gallows, he sang the Betar anthem. Seconds before he was hanged, he called out "long live the Jewish state! Long live Jabotinsky!" Following his execution, his body was turned over to six Betar members waiting at the prison gates.

Aftermath
Ben-Yosef's execution provoked outrage and mourning across the Yishuv. In Jerusalem and Tel Aviv, shops were closed and black flags were displayed from windows, and a demonstration against the execution in Tel Aviv was broken up by police. The British authorities imposed curfews in Tel Aviv and Jerusalem. A police guard was present at Ben-Yosef's funeral in Rosh Pina.

There were demonstrations of mourning across Jewish communities in Europe, particularly in Poland, where synagogues throughout the country were jammed with mourners, and tens of thousands of Jews fasted in mourning accordance with a plea by the rabbinate. In Kaunas, all Jewish theaters were closed as memorial services were held, and in Amsterdam, a stone wrapped in a note protesting "the murder of Ben Joseph" was thrown by Dutch Zionists through a window of the British consulate. Ben-Yosef's mother received cables of condolence from around the world, and Betar promised her a lifetime pension and to secure her immigration to Palestine.

The British policeman who served as Ben-Yosef's hangman, Inspector E.T. Turton, was fatally wounded in a Lehi bombing in 1942. His legs had to be amputated, and he died a week later.

Ben-Yosef became a martyr for the Revisionist cause. Today, he is commemorated by some in Israel as one of the Olei Hagardom. Streets in Israel have been named for him, and he is commemorated on Olei Hagardom memorials throughout the country.

References

External links

 http://www.etzel.org.il/english/people/benyosef.htm - profile at the Irgun website
 http://www.betar.org/history/hist-h.htm - profile at betar.org
 https://web.archive.org/web/20070202085118/http://www.betar.co.uk/betaris/shlomo.php - profile at the UK Betarist website
 https://web.archive.org/web/20070203233932/http://www.csuohio.edu/tagar/shlomo.htm- Letters from Ben-Yosef at Acre Prison

1913 births
1938 deaths
People from Lutsk
People from Lutsky Uyezd
Ukrainian Jews
Jews from the Russian Empire
Polish emigrants to Mandatory Palestine
Betar members
Irgun members
Olei Hagardom
Executed Ukrainian people
Executed Polish people
People executed by Mandatory Palestine by hanging